Politics of the Democratic Republic of Congo take place in a framework of a republic in transition from a civil war to a semi-presidential republic.

On 18 and 19 December 2005, a successful nationwide referendum was carried out on a draft constitution, which set the stage for elections in 2006. The voting process, though technically difficult due to the lack of infrastructure, was facilitated and organized by the Congolese Independent Electoral Commission with support from the UN mission to the Congo (MONUC). Early UN reports indicate that the voting was for the most part peaceful, but spurred violence in many parts of the war-torn east and the Kasais.

In 2006, many Congolese complained that the constitution was a rather ambiguous document and were unaware of its contents. This is due in part to the high rates of illiteracy in the country. However, interim President Kabila urged Congolese to vote 'Yes', saying the constitution is the country's best hope for peace in the future. 25 million Congolese turned out for the two-day balloting. According to results released in January 2006, the constitution was approved by 84% of voters. The new constitution also aims to decentralize authority, dividing the vast nation into 25 semi-autonomous provinces, drawn along ethnic and cultural lines.

The country's first democratic elections in four decades were held on 30 July 2006.

Political history

From the day of the arguably ill-prepared independence of the Democratic Republic of the Congo, the tensions between the powerful leaders of the political elite, such as Joseph Kasa Vubu, Patrice Lumumba, Moise Tshombe, Joseph Mobutu and others, jeopardize the political stability of the new state. From Tshombe's secession of the Katanga, to the assassination of Lumumba, to the two coups d'état of Mobutu, the country has known periods of true nationwide peace, but virtually no period of genuine democratic rule.

The Mobutu era
The regime of President Mobutu Sese Seko lasted 32 years (1965–1997), during which all but the first seven years the country was named Zaire. His dictatorship operated as a one-party state, which saw most of the powers concentrated between President Mobutu, who was simultaneously the head of both the party and the state through the Popular Movement of the Revolution (MPR), and a series of essentially rubber-stamping institutions.

One particularity of the Regime was the claim to be thriving for an authentic system, different from Western or Soviet influences. This lasted roughly between the establishment of Zaire in 1971, and the official beginning of the transition towards democracy, on 24 April 1990. This was true at the regular people's level as everywhere else. People were ordered by law to drop their Western Christian names; the titles Mr. and Mrs. were abandoned for the male and female versions of the French word for "citizen"; Men were forbidden to wear suits, and women to wear pants. At the institutional level, many of the institutions also changed denominations, but the end result was a system that borrowed from both systems:

The MPR's Central Committee: Under the system of the "party-state", this committee had a higher position in the institutional make-up than the government or cabinet. It had both executive oversight authority, and in practice, binding legislative authority, as it dictated the party platform. Mobutu headed the Central Committee as Founding-President. The Vice-President of the Central Committee was essentially the country's Vice President, without the succession rights.
The Executive Council: Known elsewhere as the Government or the Cabinet, this council was the executive authority in the country, made of State Commissioners (known elsewhere as ministers). For a long period of time, Mobutu was the sole leader of the Executive Council. He eventually would appoint First State Commissioners (known elsewhere as prime ministers) with largely coordinating powers and very little executive power. The last "First State Commissioner" was Kengo Wa Dondo.
The Legislative Council: essentially the rubber-stamp parliament, it was made up of People Commissioners (known elsewhere as MPs), who were sometimes elected, as individual members of the MPR, and always on the party platform.
The Supreme Court: As the judiciary, this court was seemingly the only independent branch of government, but in effect it was subordinate to a Judicial Council over which the regime had a very strong influence.

Every corporation, whether financial or union, as well as every division of the administration, was set up as branches of the party. CEOs, union leaders, and division directors were each sworn-in as section presidents of the party. Every aspect of life was regulated to some degree by the party, and the will of its founding-president, Mobutu Sese Seko.

Most of the petty aspects of the regime disappeared after 1990 with the beginning of the democratic transition. Democratization would prove to be fairly short-lived, as Mobutu's power plays dragged it in length until ultimately 1997, when forces led by Laurent Kabila eventually successfully toppled the regime, after a 9-month-long military campaign.

The Kabilas' governments and war
The government of former president Mobutu Sese Seko was toppled by a rebellion led by Laurent Kabila in May 1997, with the support of Rwanda and Uganda. They were later to turn against Kabila and backed a rebellion against him in August 1998. Troops from Zimbabwe, Angola, Namibia, Chad, and Sudan intervened to support the Kinshasa regime. A cease-fire was signed on 10 July 1999 by the DROC, Zimbabwe, Angola, Uganda, Namibia, Rwanda, and Congolese armed rebel groups, but fighting continued.

Under Laurent Kabila's regime, all executive, legislative, and military powers were first vested in the President, Laurent-Désiré Kabila. The judiciary was independent, with the president having the power to dismiss or appoint. The president was first head of a 26-member cabinet dominated by the Alliance of Democratic Forces for the Liberation of Congo (ADFL). Towards the end of the 90s, Laurent Kabila created and appointed a Transitional Parliament, with a seat in the buildings of the former Katanga Parliament, in the southern town of Lubumbashi, in a move to unite the country, and to legitimate his regime. Kabila was assassinated on 16 January 2001 and his son Joseph Kabila was named head of state ten days later.

The younger Kabila continued with his father's Transitional Parliament, but overhauled his entire cabinet, replacing it with a group of technocrats, with the stated aim of putting the country back on the track of development, and coming to a decisive end of the Second Congo War. In October 2002, the new president was successful in getting occupying Rwandan forces to withdraw from eastern Congo; two months later, an agreement was signed by all remaining warring parties to end the fighting and set up a Transition Government, the make-up of which would allow representation for all negotiating parties. Two founding documents emerged from this: The Transition Constitution, and the Global and Inclusive Agreement, both of which describe and determine the make-up and organization of the Congolese institutions, until planned elections in July 2006, at which time the provisions of the new constitution, democratically approved by referendum in December 2005, will take full effect and that is how it happened.

Under the Global and All-Inclusive Agreement, signed on 17 December 2002, in Pretoria, there was to be one President and four Vice-Presidents, one from the government, one from the Rally for Congolese Democracy, one from the MLC, and one from civil society. The position of Vice-President expired after the 2006 elections.

After being for three years (2003–06) in the interregnum between two constitutions, the Democratic Republic of the Congo is now under the regime of the Constitution of the Third Republic. The constitution, adopted by referendum in 2005, and promulgated by President Joseph Kabila in February 2006, establishes a decentralized semi-presidential republic, with a separation of powers between the three branches of government - executive, legislative and judiciary, and a distribution of prerogatives between the central government and the provinces.

In September 2016, violent protests were met with brutal force by the police and Republican Guard soldiers. Opposition groups claim 80 dead, including the Students' Union leader. From Monday 19 September Kinshasa residents, as well as residents elsewhere in Congo, where mostly confined to their homes. Police arrested anyone remotely connected to the opposition as well as innocent onlookers. Government propaganda, on television, and actions of covert government groups in the streets, acted against opposition as well as foreigners. The president's mandate was due to end on 19 December 2016, but no plans were made to elect a replacement at that time and this caused further protests.

As of 8 August 2017 there are 54 political parties legally operating in the Congo.

On 15 December 2018 US State Department announced it had decided to evacuate its employees’ family members from Democratic Republic of Congo just before the Congolese elections to choose a successor to President Joseph Kabila.

Félix Tshisekedi Presidency (2019-) 

On 30 December 2018 the presidential election to determine the successor to Kabila was held. On 10 January 2019, the electoral commission announced opposition candidate Félix Tshisekedi as the winner of the vote. He was officially sworn in as President on 24 January 2019. In the ceremony of taking of the office Félix Tshisekedi appointed Vital Kamerhe as his chief of staff. In June 2020,  chief of staff Vital Kamerhe was found guilty of embezzling public funds and he was sentenced to 20 years in prison.

The political allies of former president Joseph Kabila, who stepped down in January 2019, maintained control of key ministries, the legislature, judiciary and security services. However, President Felix Tshisekedi succeeded to strengthen his hold on power. In a series of moves, he won over more legislators, gaining the support of almost 400 out of 500 members of the National Assembly. The pro-Kabila speakers of both houses of parliament were forced out. In April 2021, the new government was formed without the supporters of Kabila.  President Felix Tshisekedi succeeded to oust the last remaining elements of his government who were loyal to former leader Joseph Kabila.

Executive branch
Since the July 2006 elections, the country is led by a semi-presidential, strongly-decentralized state. The executive at the central level, is divided between the President, and a Prime Minister appointed by him/her from the party having the majority of seats in Parlement. Should there be no clear majority, the President can appoint a "government former" that will then have the task to win the confidence of the National Assembly. The President appoints the government members (ministers) at the proposal of the Prime Minister. In coordination, the President and the government have the charge of the executive. The Prime minister and the government are responsible to the lower-house of Parliament, the National Assembly.

At the province level, the Provincial legislature (Provincial Assembly) elects a governor, and the governor, with his government of up to 10 ministers, is in charge of the provincial executive. Some domains of government power are of the exclusive provision of the Province, and some are held concurrently with the Central government. This is not a Federal state however, simply a decentralized one, as the majority of the domains of power are still vested in the Central government. The governor is responsible to the Provincial Assembly.

Criticisms
The semi-presidential system has been described by some as "conflictogenic" and "dictatogenic", as it ensures frictions, and a reduction of pace in government life, should the President and the Prime Minister be from different sides of the political arena. This was seen several times in France, a country that shares the semi-presidential model. It was also, arguably, in the first steps of the Congo into independence, the underlying cause of the crisis between Prime Minister Patrice Lumumba and President Joseph Kasa Vubu, who ultimately dismissed each other, in 1960.

In January 2015 the 2015 Congolese protests broke out in the country's capital following the release of a draft law that would extend the presidential term limits and allow Joseph Kabila to run again for office.

Legislative branch

Under the Transition Constitution 
The Inter-Congolese dialogue, that set-up the transitional institutions, created a bicameral parliament, with a National Assembly and Senate, made up of appointed representatives of the parties to the dialogue.  These parties included the preceding government, the rebel groups that were fighting against the government, with heavy Rwandan and Ugandan support, the internal opposition parties, and the Civil Society.  At the beginning of the transition, and up until recently, the National Assembly is headed by the MLC with Speaker Hon. Olivier Kamitatu, while the Senate is headed by a representative of the Civil Society, namely the head of the Church of Christ in Congo, Mgr. Pierre Marini Bodho. Hon. Kamitatu has since left both the MLC and the Parliament to create his own party, and ally with current President Joseph Kabila.  Since then, the position of Speaker is held by Hon. Thomas Luhaka, of the MLC.

Aside from the regular legislative duties, the Senate had the charge to draft a new constitution for the country.  That constitution was adopted by referendum in December 2005, and decreed into law on 18 February 2006.

Under the New Constitution
The Parliament of the third republic is also bicameral, with a National Assembly and a Senate. Members of the National Assembly, the lower - but the most powerful - house, are elected by direct suffrage. Senators are elected by the legislatures of the 26 provinces.

Judicial branch

Under the Transition Constitution

Under the New Constitution
The Congolese Judicial Branch Consists of a Supreme Court, which handles federal crimes.

Administrative divisions

Under the Transition Constitution
10 provinces (provinces, singular - province) and one city* (ville): Bandundu, Bas-Congo, Équateur, Kasai-Occidental, Kasai-Oriental, Katanga, Kinshasa*, Maniema, North Kivu, Orientale.

Each province is divided into districts and cities.

Under the New Constitution
25 provinces (provinces, singular - province) and city* (ville): Bas-Uele | Équateur | Haut-Lomami | Haut-Katanga | Haut-Uele | Ituri | Kasaï | Kasaï oriental | Kongo central | Kwango | Kwilu | Lomami | Lualaba | Lulua | Mai-Ndombe | Maniema | Mongala | North Kivu | Nord-Ubangi  | Sankuru | South Kivu | Sud-Ubangi | Tanganyika | Tshopo | Tshuapa | Kinshasa*

Each province is divided into territories and cities.

Political parties and elections

Presidential elections

Parliamentary elections

International organization participation
ACCT, ACP, AfDB, AU, CEEAC, CEPGL, East African Community, ECA, FAO, G-19, G-24, G-77, IAEA, IBRD, ICAO, ICC, ICRM, IDA, IFAD, IFC, IFRCS, IHO, ILO, IMF, UN, UNCTAD, UNESCO, UNHCR, UNIDO, UPU, WCO WFTU, WHO, WIPO, WMO, WToO, WTrO

References

External links